Stiko Per Larsson, (born 20 November 1978) is a Swedish singer and songwriter. His first self-penned music album was released on 23 April 2008 and was named Flyktsagor which peaked at number 41 on the Sverigetopplistan. His second album Kap farväl was released in April 2009 and peaked at number 30, and in 2011 his third album Varken stjärna eller frälst peaked at number 18. He then released Järnbärarland in 2013, which was followed by ...har en grej på gång in 2015. Larsson has also performed at Peace & Love festival several times.

Through P4 Nästa at Sveriges Radio he won a place in Melodifestivalen 2018 after winning the radio shows final. He will perform the song "Titta vi flyger"  in Melodifestivalens second semifinal. Larsson has since 2007 annually been going on music march for SOS Children's Villages with all proceeds going to the help organization up until 2016 his marches where he plays music for people and they give money had reached over one million (SEK).

In 2017, his music march started to raise money for the Child cancer foundation in Sweden, he marched 612 kilometers, did 27 performances and raised a total of 417 371 (SEK) for the Child Cancer foundation.

Discography

Albums

Singles

References

External links

Living people
1978 births
Swedish songwriters
21st-century Swedish singers
21st-century Swedish male singers
Melodifestivalen contestants of 2018